The women's heptathlon event at the 2009 Asian Athletics Championships was held at the Guangdong Olympic Stadium on November 10–11.

Medalists

Results

100 metres hurdles
Wind: –0.4 m/s

High jump

Shot put

200 metres
Wind: +1.1 m/s

Long jump

Javelin throw

800 metres

Final standings

References
Final results

2009 Asian Athletics Championships
Combined events at the Asian Athletics Championships
2009 in women's athletics